Vigilantes y ladrones ("vigilantes and robbers") is a 1952 Argentine comedy film directed by Carlos Rinaldi and featuring the Los Cinco Grandes del Buen Humor (Five Greats of Good Humor) group of comic actors. It stars Rafael Carret, Jorge Luz, Zelmar Gueñol, Guillermo Rico and Juan Carlos Cambón. Ángel Eleta was the choreographer for the film.

Plot
The Big Five are seeking hidden in the basement of a hotel treasure.

Cast
Rafael Carret		
Jorge Luz
Zelmar Gueñol	
Guillermo Rico	
Juan Carlos Cambón	
Amalia Sánchez Ariño		
José Comellas		
Irma Gabriel		
Vicente Rubino			
Nelly Lainez

References

External links
 

1952 films
1950s Spanish-language films
Argentine black-and-white films
Argentine vigilante films
Films directed by Carlos Rinaldi
1952 comedy films
Los Cinco Grandes del Buen Humor films
Argentine comedy films
1950s Argentine films